Keener Township is one of thirteen townships in Jasper County, Indiana, United States. As of the 2010 census, its population was 10,110 and it contained 3,977 housing units.

History 
Keener Township was established in 1858 and probably named after Jacob Keener, who settled in South Bend in 1855. A cabinet maker, stockholder of the Union Cabinet company as well as a politician, policeman, and saloon owner in South Bend, Jacob also established the Apollo - the "first German garden and place of amusement" in South Bend and a "favorite resort for politicians of both parties." The first German theater and masquerades in South Bend were held there.

Geography

Cities and towns
 De Motte
 Roselawn (east quarter)

Unincorporated towns
 Deer Park
 Forest City

Adjacent townships
 Boone Township, Porter County (northeast)
 Walker Township (east)
 Wheatfield Township (east)
 Union Township (south)
 Lincoln Township, Newton County (southwest)
 Eagle Creek Township, Lake County (northwest)

Cemeteries
The township contains three cemeteries: Cemetery of the Resurrection, DeMotte Cemetery, and First Church Cemetery (informally known as Holland Cemetery).

Major highways
  Interstate 65
  U.S. Route 231
  Indiana State Road 10
  Indiana State Road 110

Airports and landing strips
 DeMotte Airport

Education
Keener Township residents are eligible to obtain a free library card from the Jasper County Public Library.

References
 
 United States Census Bureau cartographic boundary files

External links
 Indiana Township Association
 United Township Association of Indiana

Townships in Jasper County, Indiana
Townships in Indiana